The Quanicassee River is a river in Michigan, United States.

See also
List of rivers of Michigan

References
Michigan  Streamflow Data from the USGS

Rivers of Michigan